Troll (Gunna Sijurvald) is a fictional character appearing in American comic books published by Marvel Comics.

Publication history
The character first appeared in Thunderbolts #145 (August 2010) and was created by writer Jeff Parker and artist Kevin Walker

She has appeared as a regular character in Thunderbolts since issue #157, and has remained with the team since the title transitioned into Dark Avengers beginning with issue #175.

Fictional character biography
Troll is the offspring of an Asgardian mother and a male member of the Magzi Troll tribe. She was originally held prisoner in Asgard until the Siege of Asgard destroyed her jail cell. Apprehended by the Thunderbolts, Troll was placed in a cell on The Raft despite protests by Valkyrie that she should be returned to Asgard.

When Luke Cage lead the Thunderbolts on their first mission to the Raft, they run into the young Gunna, who attacks and disables Ghost suit with her axe. Ghost tries calling for help, as the attacking girl wearing troll skin is about to slice him in two. Luckily for Ghost, Crossbones hits her in the side with one shot, causing her to fall down. Cage reprimands Crossbones for the seemingly lethal action, though the latter defends that he simply used a dart to penetrate the girl's ear. 
Later at the Raft, Valkyrie identifies the girl as Gunna, an Asgardian who was captured by the Magzi Trolls. She was locked in Asgard along with the rest of the Magzi in hopes of rehabilitating her, before the Trolls escaped after Asgard's fall. Valkyrie wants to take Gunna home but Warden Walker objects, stating that she and her Troll brethren killed and apparently ate U.S. citizens and therefore, Gunna will stay at the Raft until a court trial could be enacted. Valkyrie retorts that if the Siege on Asgard never happened, then the Trolls would never have been released. Luke Cage mediates the dispute, stating that they will leave the decision to Commander Steve Rogers. Valkyrie accepts the proposal and agrees to let Gunna remain in the Raft until then. As both Valkyrie and Walker depart, Cage advises Songbird to orientate Gunna for the duration of her stay and more importantly, teach her not to eat anybody. During a prison riot in which the power was knocked out, Songbird is attacked by a group of female prisoners. After bending the bars of her cage, Troll runs out to save her while screaming in broken English. When Moonstone (who earlier just left Songbird) runs out and claims to save the day, Songbird points out that she did nothing while Gunna saved the day. While at lunch, the other female prisoners criticize her eating habits and describe her like an unbroken house pet. When they jokingly ask if she was a cannibal, she shocks the prisoners with a deadpan "Aye."

Thor also visited Troll in her jail cell to offer her a place at Asgard, but she rejected his offer telling him that she was not Asgardian.

When a trio of male prisoners tease Gunna from behind the forcefield separating the men's courtyard from the women's. Gunna tries pouncing on them only for the forcefield to block her way. Warden John Walker and the prison guards show up to defuse the situation and discipline the prisoners. Once it is settled, one of the guards confides in Walker that Gunna is too powerful for a juvenile facility but too young for the Raft. A new Thunderbolt team is drafted in case the primary team dies on a mission with Songbird selected as leader. Therefore, she and John Walker go around the Raft and select potential recruits.

Recently, Troll was recruited to join their Beta team of the Thunderbolts nicknamed 'The Underbolts'. On the first mission, Troll saves Boomerang from being eaten by zombies.

During the Fear Itself storyline, Troll was seen fishing people out of the ocean after Juggernaut in the form of Kuurth: Breaker of Stone destroyed the Raft and was "enjoying herself."

Troll escaped together with several other inmates who were members of the Thunderbolts. Due to a failure of the teleportation technology of their tower caused by Man-Thing, the tower began to move in time as well as in space. They ended up in World War II teaming up with the Invaders to battle the Nazis. Troll as well as the rest of the team up in the 1940s due to time travel. She promptly goes hunting. After a brief skirmish with some Nazis, she starts to hang out with Mister Hyde. Troll's war axe is also a pivotal tool for the Thunderbolts in the present trying to track her through time. Troll and the rest of the Thunderbolts next end up in Victorian London. Then Troll and the Thunderbolts go even further back in time ending up in King Arthur's court in Camelot. Troll and the Thunderbolts eventually bounced back to the time of the original Baron Helmut Zemo-led Thunderbolts team. After Fixer killed his younger self which began to cause a collapse in reality and forced Fixer to assume his younger self's place, Troll returned to the future with the rest of the Thunderbolts.

While the other members of the Thunderbolts went their criminal ways, Troll stayed behind in the care of Luke Cage and Songbird, to - as the latter put it - "Show the world who you really are."

At the time when the Mother Parasite plotted to take over the world, Troll is among the younger characters that assist the Young Avengers into fighting the Mother Parasite as children and those who are young at heart can see the Mother Parasite's machinations.

Powers
Troll has been shown to have superhuman strength, displayed by bending the metal bars on her jail cell and wielding a battle-axe that mortal men find impossible to lift. She appears to have the ability to call the axe to her mentally as shown when she fought an army of Doombots in Latveria.

References

External links
 Troll at Marvel Wiki
 Troll at Comic Vine

Characters created by Jeff Parker
Characters created by Kev Walker
Comics characters introduced in 2010
Fictional axefighters
Fictional trolls
Fictional women soldiers and warriors
Marvel Comics Asgardians
Marvel Comics characters with superhuman strength
Norse mythology in popular culture
Works based on European myths and legends